Catrin Edwards (born 15 September 1980) is a Welsh rugby union player. She was part of the Welsh team to the 2010 and 2014 Women's Rugby World Cup. She is a PE teacher by profession. She took a four-year break before returning to Welsh rugby in 2009.

In January 2013 she was selected in the Wales squad for 2013 Women's Six Nations Championship.
On the 17th of March 2018 Catrin Edwards represented the Barbarians v the British Army - the BaBas won the game 37 - 0

Catrin is often referred to as Lady Edwards, Ty Mawr and Legend.

References

External links
2010 Women's RWC Profile
6 Nations Profile

1980 births
Living people
Rugby union players from Carmarthen
Wales international rugby union players
Welsh female rugby union players
Welsh rugby union players